Puttalam Hindu Central College ( Puttaḷam Hindu Maththiya  Kalloori, PHCC) is a national school in Puttalam, Sri Lanka It was founded in 1979 by the late Nadaraja Devar and the late Ratnasingam.

History
founded in 1979 by the late Nadaraja Devar and the late Ratnasingam. Puttalam Hindu Maha Saba(இந்து மகா சபை) also contribute to of founding the school. Early Called Hindu Tamil Maha Vidyalayam(இந்து தமிழ் மகா வித்தியாலயம்) After Change to Hindu Central College On Silver Jubilee.

Notes 
Rebuild

References 

National schools in Sri Lanka
Schools in Puttalam District